The rectus sheath, also called the rectus fascia, is formed by the aponeuroses of the transverse abdominal and the internal and external oblique muscles. It contains the rectus abdominis and pyramidalis muscles.

Structure 
The rectus sheath can be divided into anterior and posterior laminae. The arrangement of the layers has important variations at different locations in the body.

Below the costal margin 
For context, above the sheath are the following two layers:

 Camper's fascia (anterior part of Superficial fascia)
 Scarpa's fascia (posterior part of the Superficial fascia)

Within the sheath, the layers vary:

Below the sheath are the following three layers:
 transversalis fascia
 extraperitoneal fat
 parietal peritoneum

The rectus, in the situation where its sheath is deficient below, is separated from the peritoneum only by the transversalis fascia, in contrast to the upper layers, where part of the internal oblique also runs beneath the rectus. Because of the thinner layers below, this region is more susceptible to herniation.

Above the costal margin 
Since the tendons of the internal oblique and transversus abdominis only reach as high as the costal margin, it follows that above this level the sheath of the rectus is deficient behind, the muscle resting directly on the cartilages of the ribs, and being covered only by the tendons of the external obliques.

Clinical significance 
The rectus sheath is a useful attachment for surgical meshes during abdominal surgery. This has a higher risk of infection than many other attachment sites.

Additional images

References

External links 
  - "Incisions and the contents of the rectus sheath."
  - "Anterior Abdominal Wall: The Rectus Abdominis Muscle"
  - anterior layer
  - posterior layer above arcuate line
  - posterior layer above arcuate line
 
  - "The Rectus Sheath, Anterior View & Transverse Section"

Abdomen
Muscles of the torso